A small number of municipalities in Serbia held local elections in 2002. These were not part of the country's regular cycle of local elections but instead took place in jurisdictions where the local government had fallen.

Serbia introduced the direct election of mayors via two-round voting in 2002. Elections for local assemblies, which were previously held under first past the post rules in single-member constituencies, were determined by proportional representation with a three per cent electoral threshold. Successful lists were required to receive three per cent of all votes, not only of valid votes.

Results

Belgrade

Barajevo
Elections took place in Barajevo on 22 December 2002 to elect a mayor and members of the municipal assembly. The second round of voting in the mayoral election took place on 5 January 2003. When the next regular cycle of local elections took place in 2004, the constituent municipalities of Belgrade were exempted from the direct election of mayors.

Results of the municipal assembly election:

Central Serbia (excluding Belgrade)

Despotovac
Elections took place in Despotovac on 22 December 2022, fourteen months after the introduction of temporary measures in the municipality due to local political instability. The second round of voting in the mayoral election took place on 5 January 2003.

Results of the municipal assembly election:

Ražanj
Elections took place in Ražanj on 22 December 2002 to elect a mayor and members of the municipal assembly. The second round of voting in the mayoral election took place on 5 January 2003.

Results of the municipal assembly election:

References

Local elections in Serbia
Serbia